Hazel is a surname.

Notable people with the name include:

 Alfred Hazel (1869–1944), British Member of Parliament and academic
 Eddie Hazel (1950–1992), American singer and funk guitarist
 John Hazel (footballer), Scottish former footballer
 John R. Hazel (1860–1951), American judge
 John T. "Til" Hazel (1930-2022), American businessman and lawyer
 Nancy Hazel, British scientist in social work

See also
 Hazle (surname)